The Albanian Spartakiad was an event similar to the USSR Spartakiad and to the Czechoslovakian Spartakiad. Six such events were held in Albania during Communist rule (in 1959, 1969, 1974, 1979, 1984, and 1989).

The Spartakiad included a mass gymnastics display, professional and amateur sports championships. It was the biggest sports event in Albania during communist rule, with hundreds of thousands of participants.

References

External links
  In video: 1 minute documentary from the Albanian second spartakiada.

1959 establishments in Albania
Defunct multi-sport events
Multi-sport events in Albania
Albania
Recurring sporting events established in 1959
Sport in Albania
Recurring events disestablished in 1989
Politics and sports